John Calvin Jeffries, Jr. (born ca. 1948) is a prominent law professor and was dean of the University of Virginia School of Law from 2001 to 2008.

Biography 
Jeffries is the David and Mary Harrison Distinguished Professor of Law at the University of Virginia School of Law. He is best known for his work in criminal law, with his essays included in many major textbooks in the subject area.  He is also a co-author of one of the foremost criminal law textbooks, Criminal Law with Professors Richard J. Bonnie, Anne M. Coughlin, and Peter W. Low.  Jeffries has authored or co-authored a total of ten textbooks, primarily on civil rights and criminal law.  Jeffries also wrote a biography about Justice Powell titled Justice Lewis F. Powell Jr. (New York:  Charles Scribner's Sons, 1994). .  He co-authored a book on the trial of John Hinckley.

Jeffries graduated from Yale University in 1970 and the University of Virginia School of Law in 1973.  During law school, Jeffries served as editor-in-chief of the Virginia Law Review. He received the Z Award for the highest academic average and the Woods Prize for the outstanding graduate. Immediately after graduation, he became a law clerk to U.S. Supreme Court Justice Lewis F. Powell, Jr. before serving in the U.S. Army as a second lieutenant for one year.

As dean at Virginia Law, Jeffries made significant achievements in the school.  Among them, he created the Law & Business Program, a curricular innovation designed to give law students the accounting and finance skills required to communicate effectively in the business world. Jeffries also oversaw the creation of the Center for the Study of Race and Law in 2003.  In 2006 the law school received close to $10 million in donations (then a record for the school) and contributions from more than 50% of its living alumni, setting up a 14-year run with more than half of graduates giving.

In late summer of 2007, Jeffries announced he would step down in July 2008 as dean to pursue teaching again.  He spent the next academic year on sabbatical, spending the fall semester of 2008 teaching at Columbia Law School.  Following his sabbatical he returned to teach at Virginia Law. In 2017 he received the Thomas Jefferson Award for excellence in scholarship; the awards are the highest honor given to members of the University community. From 2018-2021 he served as senior vice president for advancement at the University of Virginia.  After stepping down from that position, he retained a part-time appointment as counselor to UVA President Jim Ryan while continuing to serve on the law School faculty.

Jeffries is highly regarded for his teaching: Ryan has described Jeffries as "simply the best classroom teacher I've ever seen."

See also 
 List of law clerks of the Supreme Court of the United States (Seat 1)

References

External links
 Univ. of Virginia School of Law biography
"Dean's list: Jeffries looks forward to teaching"
Uvamagazine.org
Virginia.edu

1948 births
American legal scholars
Living people
University of Virginia School of Law alumni
University of Virginia School of Law faculty
Yale University alumni
Law clerks of the Supreme Court of the United States